Mandarin, subtitled A Novel of Viet Nam, is a novel by John Havan. The protagonist, Bach, is the first-born son of the most powerful mandarin at the Nguyễn dynasty court in Hue.

At the time of Bach's birth, Virtnam's historical feudal system is locked in a struggle with French colonial exploitation, Japanese imperialism, and Ho Chi Minh's communist fanatics. Bach grows up to be a robust and handsome young man, irresistible to the women in his life, brilliant at his studies and with a natural gift for the martial arts, but his way of life is doomed in the cataclysmic birth throes of the modern Vietnamese socialist state. The book is an epic tale of love and war, struggle, loss, and rebirth.

A sequel, The Tiger General, chronicles the life of Bach's son, Hai.

References

2008 novels
English-language novels
Novels set in Vietnam
Historical novels